Marian Siejkowski (29 August 1940 in Poznań – 31 October 1990  in Poznań) was a Polish Olympic rower.

References

1940 births
1990 deaths
Polish male rowers
Rowers at the 1964 Summer Olympics
Rowers at the 1972 Summer Olympics 
Olympic rowers of Poland
Sportspeople from Poznań
European Rowing Championships medalists